Eric Caudieux is a French sound engineer and producer. An accomplished player of the keyboards and rhythm guitar, he is best known for his work with Joe Satriani, appearing on many of his albums and as a member of his backing group when he is on tour. As an engineer, editor, producer and composer he has worked with other artists including Guns N' Roses, Katy Perry, Dido, Brad Mehldau and Blake Mills. As a guitarist, he is left handed.

Caudieux was an assistant engineer on the set of I Heart Huckabees (2004).
He also worked on the set of Synecdoche, New York (2008).

References

Further reading

American rock keyboardists
Living people
American rock guitarists
American audio engineers
American record producers
Year of birth missing (living people)